Meserqan (also Romanized as Meşerqān; also known as Masar Ghan and Mīsarqān) is a village in Kharqan District, Zarandieh County, Markazi Province, Iran. At the 2006 census, its population was 452, in 143 families.

References 

Populated places in Zarandieh County